The ashy-faced owl (Tyto glaucops) is a species of owl in the family Tytonidae.
It is endemic to the Caribbean island of Hispaniola (split between Haiti and the Dominican Republic). Its natural habitats are subtropical or tropical dry shrubland, subtropical or tropical high-altitude shrubland, and heavily degraded former forest.

Description
The ashy-faced owl is quite similar to the darker types of the American barn owl (Tyto furcata), and was formerly conspecific with it. The facial disc is heart-shaped and ashy-grey. The dorsal (upper) surface of the head and body is yellowish-brown speckled with dark grey or black and the ventral (under) surface is pale. The call is a rapid series of clicks followed by a wheeze, and the bird can also emit a shrill scream.

Distribution
The ashy-faced owl is endemic to Hispaniola and some of the smaller islands in its vicinity, though it is more common in the Dominican Republic than Haiti. Its typical habitat is forest and open woodland and it is often found near towns and villages.

Behavior
The ashy-faced owl is a resident species and does not migrate. It nests in holes in trees, in crevices in rocks, on rocky ledges and inside buildings. A clutch of between three and seven eggs is laid some time between January and July.

Ecology
Like most other owls, the ashy-faced owl is nocturnal and feeds on small vertebrates, such as the Hispaniolan solenodon (Solenodon paradoxus). The American barn owl (Tyto furcata) was first recorded in Hispaniola around 1950. A study, published in 2010, was undertaken in the Dominican Republic to determine the diets of both owls, and whether they compete with each other for food. This was done by examining the regurgitated pellets the owls produce, which contain the undigested bones, fur, and feathers of their prey. It was found that they each consume over 100 species of prey, with 92 species being in common between the two. Small mammals predominated in both diets, particularly so in the American barn owl, and made up the greatest proportion of the biomass. Both caught a similar proportion of bats, but the ashy-faced owl caught more birds. Amphibians and reptiles were also consumed more often by the ashy-faced owl than by the American barn owl. No conclusion could be reached as to whether the competition for food which was caused by the arrival of the American barn owl, or if it was detrimental to the native species.

Status
The IUCN lists the ashy-faced owl in its Red List of Threatened Species as being of Least Concern. This is because it has a very wide range across Hispaniola (mostly the Dominican Republic) and, although the bird is not common, its population appears to be stable.  The ashy-faced owl faces competition for nesting sites and suitable habitat from the sympatric American barn owl (Tyto furcata).

References 

ashy-faced owl
Endemic birds of the Caribbean
Endemic birds of Hispaniola
Birds of Hispaniola
Birds of the Dominican Republic
Birds of Haiti
ashy-faced owl
Taxonomy articles created by Polbot